= Tithenidia =

Tithenidia (Ancient Greek: τιθηνίδια) was a festival celebrated at Sparta by the nurses (τιτθαί) who had charge of the male children of citizens. During this festival, the nurses carried the little boys out of the city to the temple of Artemis Corythallia, which was situated near the stream Tiasa. There they sacrificed sucking-pigs on behalf of the children and afterwards held a feast, probably of the meat of the victims, accompanied by oven-baked loaves (ἰπνίτας ἄρτους).
